Helmut Willke (born 30 May 1945 in Tailfingen) is a German sociologist who studies the effect of globalization on modern society. He coined the term Atopia to denote a society that exists without borders, with no national identity. He is currently professor at Zeppelin University in Friedrichshafen, Germany.
Helmut Willke has been teaching planning and decision theory since 1983 in the University of Bielefeld’s department of sociology, and state theory and global governance since 2002. He also holds visiting professorships in Washington, D.C., Geneva and Vienna.
His main areas of interest and praxis are in systems theory, state theory, global governance and global regime building; organizational development, systems dynamics and systems guidance; and knowledge management (introduction, instruments, strategies).
He participated in Social Trends Institute's Experts Meeting "Family Policies in the Western Countries".

Works
 Systemtheorie I.  Eine Einführung in die Grundprobleme. 7th Edition, Stuttgart 2004 (UTB)
 Systemtheorie II: Interventionstheorie. 3rd Edition, Stuttgart 1999 (UTB)
 Systemtheorie III: Steuerungstheorie. 3rd Edition, Stuttgart 1995 (UTB)
 Ironie des Staates, Frankfurt 1992 (Suhrkamp)
 Supervision des Staates, Frankfurt 1997 (Suhrkamp)
 Systemisches Wissensmanagement, Stuttgart 1998 (UTB)
Atopia - Studien zur atopischen Gesellschaft, Suhrkamp, 2001
Dystopia, Frankfurt 2002 (Suhrkamp)
 Heterotopia, Frankfurt 2003 (Suhrkamp).

References

German sociologists
1945 births
Living people
German male writers